Jean-Marc Richard (born 18 September 1960 in Lausanne) is a Swiss radio and television personality, best known for his work with Radio télévision suisse.

Since the 1993 Contest Richard has been the Swiss French commentator for the Eurovision Song Contest. Richard was unable to commentate on the 1996 and 1997 Contests, and Pierre Grandjean filled in; however he returned to commentate on the 1998 Contest. Since the 2005 Contest Richard has co-commentated the event with other television presenters, and has co-hosted the contest with Nicolas Tanner since the 2008 Contest.

Currently he hosts various programmes broadcast on the Swiss French television station Télévision suisse romande including Miss Switzerland and various music competitions. He is married and has several children, he is a supporter of the foundation Terre des hommes.

External links
  Biography at RTS Website

1960 births
Living people
People from Lausanne
Swiss television personalities
Swiss game show hosts
Swiss-French people
Switzerland in the Eurovision Song Contest